James Barry Kruger (born 23 June 1986) is a South African professional golfer who plays on the Japan Golf Tour, the Sunshine Tour and the Asian Tour. He was born in Kimberley, Northern Cape and turned professional in 2007. He is known professionally as Jbe' Kruger.

Kruger has won five times on the Sunshine Tour. He won the Avantha Masters in February 2012, an event co-sanctioned by the European Tour and Asian Tours. He also won the Shinhan Donghae Open in September 2019, which was co-sanctioned by the Japan Golf Tour, the Asian Tour and the Korean Tour.

Professional wins (7)

European Tour wins (1)

1Co-sanctioned by the Asian Tour

Japan Golf Tour wins (1)

1Co-sanctioned by the Asian Tour and the Korean Tour

Asian Tour wins (2)

1Co-sanctioned by the European Tour
2Co-sanctioned by the Japan Golf Tour and the Korean Tour

Asian Tour playoff record (0–1)

Sunshine Tour wins (5)

Results in major championships

CUT = missed the half-way cut
"T" = tied

Results in World Golf Championships
Results not in chronological order before 2015.

"T" = Tied

External links

South African male golfers
Sunshine Tour golfers
European Tour golfers
Sportspeople from Kimberley, Northern Cape
Sportspeople from Bloemfontein
White South African people
1986 births
Living people